Cratohaerea is a genus of beetles in the family Cicindelidae, containing the following species:

 Cratohaerea brunet (Gory, 1833)
 Cratohaerea chrysopyga (W. Horn, 1892)
 Cratohaerea confusa Basilewsky, 1954

References

Cicindelidae